Guillermo Diaz may refer to:

Guillermo Díaz (footballer, born 1926), Chilean footballer
Guillermo Díaz (footballer, born 1930) (1930–1997), Chilean footballer
Guillermo Díaz (wrestler) (born 1964), Mexican Olympic wrestler
Guillermo Díaz (actor) (born 1975), American actor
Guillermo Díaz (footballer, born 1979), Uruguayan footballer
Guillermo Diaz (basketball) (born 1985), Puerto Rican basketball player
Guillermo Díaz (footballer, born 1994), Chilean footballer